Charandeep Surneni is an Indian actor who is known for his works in the South Indian film industry. He was noted for his roles in the films like Jilla, Sigaram Thodu and Boxer.

Early life
Charandeep Surneni, also known as Charandeep, was born in Kadapa, Andhra Pradesh. Both of his parents are government employees. He completed his B.tech from J.B.Institute of Engineering & Technology and done his MBA from the KGRITM institute. from his childhood he was fascinated about movies and always interested in cultural programs.

Film career
Charandeep started his film career with a small role in Telugu Movie Baanam and later did small roles in a couple of films until he got a break with Jilla in which he played a negative role opposite Vijay, After the success of Jilla at box office, Charandeep acted in the Telugu Movie Billa Ranga where he played a character called Baby and his last film in the year 2014 was Vikram Prabhu starrer Sigaram Thodu. In the year 2015, his first movie was Nandamuri Kalyan Ram's Pataas in Telugu later he has done movies like Tungabhadra where he played Thrimurtulu and in Vinavayya Ramayya he played as Veera Babu, Charandeep also debuted in Kannada with the movie Boxer where he played as the main antagonist in the movie, apart from these he has worked with Tollywood ace directors like S. S. Rajamouli and Puri Jagannadh for the first time, Director Puri Jagannadh cast him opposite Varun Tej in the movie Loafer and he played as Kalakeya's brother in the film Baahubali: The Beginning.

Filmography

References

Telugu male actors
Kannada male actors
Living people
People from Kadapa district
1987 births
Male actors from Andhra Pradesh
Male actors in Telugu cinema
Indian male film actors
Male actors in Kannada cinema
Male actors in Tamil cinema
21st-century Indian male actors